The New South Wales State Emergency Service (NSW SES), an agency of the Government of New South Wales, is an emergency and rescue service dedicated to assisting the community in times of natural and man-made disasters. The NSW SES is made up almost entirely of volunteer members, numbering over 10,214 as of July 2021. Members are easily identified by their distinctive orange overalls.

The agency is led by its Commissioner who reports to the Minister for Emergency Services and Resilience, presently Steph Cooke.

Leadership 
The current Commissioner of the NSW SES is Carlene York who took up her appointment on 28 October 2019. The Minister for Emergency Services and Resilience, Steph Cooke, is responsible to the NSW parliament for the emergency services portfolio which includes NSW SES.

Prior to 1989 the NSW SES reported through a Pro-Director to the Commissioner of Police

Emergency support

The major responsibilities of the NSW SES are for flood (including Flood Rescue), tsunami and storm operations. The NSW SES also provides the majority of General Land Rescue effort in the rural parts of the state. This includes road crash rescue, vertical rescue, general rescue, bush search and rescue, evidence searches (both metropolitan and rural) and other forms of specialist rescue that may be required due to local threats. The Service's trained rescuers also support the full-time emergency services during major disasters.

The NSW SES also assist other emergency services when they are performing major operations. These services include the New South Wales Police Force, NSW Rural Fire Service, Fire and Rescue NSW and New South Wales Ambulance.

During the 17/18 Financial Year, NSW SES Personnel answered 81,197 calls at the State Operations Centre, including 36,169 calls to the Flood/Storm assistance line (132 500) and its volunteers responded to 18,040 Requests for Assistance (RFAs).

Organisational Structure

State Level 
The State Headquarters (SHQ) of the NSW SES is located in Burelli Street, Wollongong.

At a state level, Directors are responsible for key functional areas (Finance, Assets & Business Services / Information & Communications Technology / Operational Response / Organisational Performance & Engagement / People & Development / Planning & Preparedness / Training) each Director is appointed to the rank of Assistant Commissioner. All these positions are based at NSW SES State Headquarters in Wollongong.

With 5 zones located across the state, Zone boundaries are generally based on river catchments, reflecting that floods are a major part of their work. The boundaries for the NSW SES's 240+ units are based broadly on local government boundaries, each unit is grouped with 2-7 other units to form a cluster.

Zone Level 
As part of the Organisational Restructure project,  on 2 October 2018, Regions were replaced with Zones. The previous 17 Regions had been based on river catchment areas, inline with the NSW SES responsibility to manage flood events, however an analysis of the demands placed upon the service indicates that a more effective way to organise Units would be based around areas which both reflected historic trends in terms of affected areas, and the distribution of the population across the state.

This resulted in the formation of 5 Zones.

Zone offices are managed by a Zone Controller and the Zone Business Support Services Manager, together form the Zone Management Team. Each Zone office could house a number of different staff roles including Zone Volunteer Communications & Engagement Officer, Zone Capability Officer, Zone Training & Delivery Officer, Zone Training Adviser, Zone Operational Readiness Officer, Financial Services Officer, Administrative Support Officer, additionally Zone offices can also accommodate some state wide staff roles, traditionally located at the state headquarters, these positions include, Coordinator Exercise Planning & Design, Planning & Research Officer, Safety, Health & Wellbeing Officer, Manager Hazard Planning, Coordinator Community Capability, Manager Capability & Resource Planning.

Zones may also have a number of volunteer capability units to support the Zone.

Cluster Level 
Dependent on factors such local operational demands, local Unit sizes, etc. Units can be grouped into Clusters. A cluster may contain 2-7 Units.

NSW SES Clusters are managed by a Local Commander. Local Commanders oversee operations at a scale between localised events which can be managed at a Unit Level, and larger scale events which require management at a Zone Level.

Unit Level 
There are more than 240 SES Units forming the NSW SES. Most are based on former local government boundaries, although the NSW SES now also allows for the formation of Units which are not bound to geographic boundaries, such as the NSW SES Bush Search and Rescue Unit.

NSW SES Units are completely staffed by volunteers managed by Unit Commanders.

Zone Level

2022 Restructure 
In 2022 Commissioner York announced changes to the structure of the NSW SES. This included the creation of two additional zones, splitting the Northern Zone and Western Zone both into two zones to provided additional support and resourcing to local communities.

State Level 
There is a number of state based units outside of the zone structure. These units generally have a state wide focus or report directly to the state capability team.

Fleet

Rank and Insignia
In January 2018 the NSW State Emergency Service commenced a review of the rank and insignia structure within the organisation. Between October and December 2018 all members of the NSW State Emergency Service transitioned to the new rank structure.

Honours and awards

Funding and support
The NSW SES receives funding primarily from the NSW Government. Resources are often obtained through numerous grants provided by public and private entities.

See also
 State Emergency Service
 Australasian Fire and Emergency Service Authorities Council

References

External links
 

Emergency services in New South Wales
State Emergency Service